The Lions are a Los Angeles-based reggae group made up of players from other bands. The band includes Dan Ubick on guitar and various singers, including Malik Moore and Black Shakespeare.

Discography
Jungle Struttin''' 2008This Generation 2013Soul Riot'' 2015

References

American reggae musical groups